Narayan College, Goreyakothi is a degree college in Goriakothi, Bihar, India. It is a constituent unit of Jai Prakash University. The college offers intermediate and three years degree course (TDC) in arts and science.

History 
The college was established in the year 1972.

Departments 

 Arts
 Hindi
 Urdu
  English
 Philosophy
 Economics
 Political Science
 History
 Geography
 Psychology
 Science
 Mathematics
 Physics
 Chemistry
 Zoology
 Botany

References

External links 

 Jai Prakash University website

Colleges in India
Constituent colleges of Jai Prakash University
Educational institutions established in 1972
1972 establishments in Bihar